The Ernest M. Wood Office and Studio is a building located in the Adams County, Illinois city of Quincy. The building was designed by Quincy architect Ernest M. Wood and reflects the designs of Frank Lloyd Wright; as such it is an example of Prairie style architecture. The building, stucco and wood, was completed in 1912 and listed on the National Register of Historic Places on August 12, 1982. The Office and Studio incorporates typical elements of Prairie style such as geometric shapes and horizontals. A restoration during the 1980s helped to repair such features as skylights, stained glass windows and built-in bookcases.

References

External links
National Register nomination

Buildings and structures in Quincy, Illinois
National Register of Historic Places in Adams County, Illinois
Commercial buildings on the National Register of Historic Places in Illinois
Buildings and structures completed in 1912